Dame Bernadette Mary Kelly  (born 10 March 1964) is a British senior civil servant who has served as permanent secretary for the Department for Transport since 18 April 2017.

Early life
Kelly was born on 10 March 1964 to Edward and Teresa Kelly. Her father was a bus driver. She was educated at King Edward VI Camp Hill School for Girls in Birmingham, followed by the University of Hull. She gained an MBA at Imperial College, London.

Career
Kelly joined the Civil Service after graduating, and worked in the Department for Communities and Local Government, the Treasury, Cabinet Office and the Number 10 Policy Unit. She was a director general at the Department for Business, Innovation and Skills from 2010 until 2015, when she became director general for the Rail Group in the Department for Transport, a post she held until she was appointed permanent secretary for that department on 18 April 2017. Her promotion followed Philip Rutnam's move to the Home Office.

Kelly was appointed Companion of the Order of the Bath (CB) in 2010 and Dame Commander of the Order of the Bath (DCB) in the 2022 Birthday Honours for services to government.

References

Living people
1964 births
Permanent Under-Secretaries of State for Transport
Civil servants in HM Treasury
Civil servants in the Department for Business, Innovation and Skills
Dames Commander of the Order of the Bath
People educated at King Edward VI Camp Hill School for Girls